Soa is an uninhabited tidal island off the coast of Tiree, to the south of the settlement of Ruaig.

At low tide it is joined to mainland Tiree by a sand tombolo and numerous rocky outcrops. The largest of the rock platforms, Carsamull is itself a little island at high tide.

Soa is not populated and probably never was on a permanent basis, but a former building has been identified on the south-eastern limb (Eilean an Triogh)

There is also a track which runs along the northern coast of Soa.

Statistics: (Areas calculated based MHWS contour using Magic.defra)

Soa - Area 24.9ha (61.5 acres) - High point c.12m (40')

Carsamull - Area 2.1ha (5.2 acres) (only rises to a few metres/feet)

At low tide the area of rocky land separated from the mainland by sand and incorporating Soa, Carsamull and other rocky outcrops more than doubles to c. 58ha (143 acres)

History 
The name "Soa" is Old Norse and means "sheep island".

References 

Uninhabited islands of Argyll and Bute
Tiree